Hilda Kibet (born 27 March 1981 in Keiyo District) is a Dutch runner of Kenyan birth. She is the sister of Sylvia Kibet and the niece of Lornah Kiplagat. She obtained Dutch nationality in October 2007.

Kibet's longtime partner is Dutch marathon runner Hugo van den Broek. They split their time between Iten, Kenya and Castricum, in the Netherlands. Her great-great-aunt, who is only six years her senior, is fellow runner Lornah Kiplagat.

Career

She won a series of road running competitions in 2007, including: the Egmond Half Marathon, New York City Half Marathon, City-Pier-City Loop, Parelloop and British 10km London Run. The following year she won the New York Mini 10K, succeeding her great-aunt Lornah Kiplagat, and made her Olympic debut at the 2008 Beijing Olympics, where she was fifteenth in the 10,000 metres. She won the women's title at the 2008 European Cross Country Championships at the end of the year.

She ran at the World 10K Bangalore in May 2009 and although she was one of the pre-race favourites, she finished fourth overall. She returned the following year, but only managed sixth place.

She opened 2010 with a personal best run of 1:08:39 at the RAK Half Marathon. Kibet was the sole runner selected to represent the Netherlands at the 2010 IAAF World Cross Country Championships and she finished in tenth place in the senior race. Later in the season she ran in the 10,000 m at the 2010 European Athletics Championships, but just missed out on the medals by finishing fourth behind Jéssica Augusto. She won the Dam tot Damloop in September 2010, running the fastest 10-mile time of the season (51:30), and beating her aunt Lornah Kiplagat. At the Frankfurt Marathon in October she ran a personal best time of 2:26:23, which was only enough for sixth in the quick race.

Her first race of 2011 was again the RAK Half Marathon, but she was a minute slower than the previous year and came sixth. She had a much better performance at the Rotterdam Marathon in April, where she came second with a personal best run of 2:24:27 hours just behind Philes Ongori. She was the first Dutch runner to finish at the Montferland Run in December, placing third overall.

Kibet attempted a third career win at the Egmond Half Marathon, but finished in third place. She claimed victory at the Göteborgsvarvet in May with a run of 1:09:27 hours, then came third at the New York Mini 10K a month later. She was chosen to run the marathon at the 2012 London Olympics and she managed 24th place with her time of 2:28:52 hours. Her season's best run came at the Turin Marathon, where she ran 2:25:46 as the runner-up behind Sharon Cherop, who broke the course record.

She set a new best for the half marathon with a run of 67:59 minutes for fourth at the Roma-Ostia Half Marathon in February 2013. She was the fastest athlete at the Rotterdam Marathon with her third-place finish in 2:26:42 hours.

Career highlights

Dutch National Championships
2008 - Schoorl, 1st, 10 km

Other achievements
2004 - Groningen, 1st, 4 Mijl van Groningen
2004 - Brunssum, 1st, Parelloop
2005 - Breda, 1st, Bredase Singelloop
2005 - Manchester, 3rd, Great Manchester Run
2005 - Egmond aan Zee, 1st, Egmond Half Marathon
2006 - Tilburg, 2nd, Warandeloop
2006 - Groningen, 1st, 4 Mijl van Groningen
2006 - Egmond aan Zee, 2nd, Egmond Half Marathon
2007 - Egmond aan Zee, 1st, Egmond half marathon
2007 - The Hague, 1st, City-Pier-City Loop
2007 - Brunssum, 1st, Parelloop
2007 - London, 1st, British 10km London Run
2007 - New York City, 1st, New York City Half Marathon
2007 - Amsterdam – Zaandam, 2nd, Dam tot Damloop
2008 - Brussels, 1st, European Cross Country Championships
2008 - Montferland, 1st, Montferland Run
2009 - Amman, 6th, IAAF World Cross Country Championships
2009 - Amsterdam – Zaandam, 2nd, Dam tot Damloop
2009 - Amsterdam, 3rd, Amsterdam Marathon

Personal bests

References

External links
Official website

1981 births
Living people
Kenyan female long-distance runners
Kenyan female marathon runners
Dutch female long-distance runners
Dutch female marathon runners
Olympic athletes of the Netherlands
Athletes (track and field) at the 2008 Summer Olympics
Athletes (track and field) at the 2012 Summer Olympics
Dutch people of Kenyan descent
Dutch sportspeople of African descent
People from Elgeyo-Marakwet County
Kenyan emigrants to the Netherlands
European Athletics Championships medalists
European Cross Country Championships winners